Fernando "Nando" Maria Neves (born 9 June 1978) is a retired Cape Verdean football defender who played for the Cape Verde national football team.

Biography
He played with Batuque of Mindelo in its youth team.  He appeared in the Portuguese team of Amarante FC for a season in 1998, after he was a squad member of Portimonense for a season. He was elected the best central defender and the best foreign player of the season 2006-2007 in Tunisia, one of the first Cape Verdeans to be honoured, and he has recently signed a contract with a Qatar team, Al Sailiya, for the season 2007/2008. In July 2009 he moved to FC Baník Ostrava, he made 54 appearances and scored seven goals.  In 2011, he played with LB Châteauroux for two seasons, he appeared 62 time and just scored a goal. He went back to the Czech Republic and played with Slavia Prague for a season, making 18 appearances and scoring no goals.  A year later, he played with FK Příbram also for a season and had 16 appearances and scored a goal, this was his last club appearance.

International career
He was a member of the Cape Verde national team in 2006 and 2010 FIFA World Cup qualification. After Cape Verde were eliminated, he received a call-up in August 2009 for a friendly against Malta and Angola and in May 2010 played in the 0–0 draw with Portugal. Nando was the Cape Verdean team captain in the 2013 Africa Cup of Nations, which marked the first participation for his country in this tournament. His performances throughout the tournament were rewarded by selection into the 2013 Africa Cup of Nations Team of the Tournament. His last international match was on February 2, 2013, against Ghana at the ACN quarter-finals, in which his team were beaten 2-0. After this defeat he announced his immediate retirement from the national team.

Honours
Grasshoppers
 Swiss Super League: 2002–03
Individual
 Championnat de Tunisie Best Central Defender: 2006–07
 Championnat de Tunisie Best Foreign Player: 2006–07
 Africa Cup of Nations Team of the Tournament: 2013

References

External links
 
 
 

1978 births
Living people
Sportspeople from Praia
Footballers  from Santiago, Cape Verde
Cape Verdean footballers
Cape Verde international footballers
2013 Africa Cup of Nations players
Association football defenders
Batuque FC players
Amarante F.C. players
Portimonense S.C. players
US Monastir (football) players
Al-Sailiya SC players
FC Baník Ostrava players
LB Châteauroux players
SK Slavia Prague players
1. FK Příbram players
Cape Verdean expatriate footballers
Expatriate footballers in Portugal
Expatriate footballers in the Czech Republic
Expatriate footballers in Qatar
Expatriate footballers in France
Cape Verdean expatriate sportspeople in Portugal
Cape Verdean expatriate sportspeople in the Czech Republic
Cape Verdean expatriate sportspeople in Qatar
Cape Verdean expatriate sportspeople in France
Czech First League players
Ligue 2 players
Qatar Stars League players